Johan de Witt (24 September 1625 – 20 August 1672), lord of Zuid- en Noord-Linschoten, Snelrewaard, Hekendorp en IJsselvere, was a Dutch statesman and a major political figure in the Dutch Republic in the mid-17th century, the First Stadtholderless Period, when its flourishing sea trade in a period of globalization made the republic a leading European trading and seafaring power – now commonly referred to as the Dutch Golden Age. De Witt controlled the Dutch political system from around 1650 until shortly before his murder and cannibalisation by a pro-Orangist mob in 1672.

As a leading republican of the Dutch States Party, de Witt opposed the House of Orange-Nassau and the Orangists and preferred a shift of power from the central government to the regenten. However, his neglect of the Dutch army (as the regents focused only on merchant vessels, thinking they could avoid war) proved disastrous when the Dutch Republic suffered numerous early defeats in the Rampjaar (1672). In the hysteria that followed the effortless invasion by an alliance of England, France and some German states he and his brother Cornelis de Witt were blamed and lynched in The Hague, with their corpses at least partially eaten by the rioters. These cannibals were never prosecuted, and some historians claim William of Orange may have incited them.

Early life

Johan de Witt was a member of the old Dutch patrician family De Witt. His father was Jacob de Witt, an influential regent and burgher from the patrician class in the city of Dordrecht, which in the seventeenth century was one of the most important cities of the dominating province of Holland. De Witt's mother was Anna van den Corput (1599–1645), niece of Johannes Corputius, an influential Dutch military leader and cartographer. He had an older brother, Cornelis de Witt, who had a steep career in the shadow of Johan de Witt. His uncle Andries de Witt held the position of Grand Pensionary of Holland between 1619 and 1621. Through the marriage of one of his other uncles to Margaretha of Nassau, daughter of Anna Johanna of Nassau-Siegen, De Witt was a distant relative of the later Dutch governor and English King William III of Orange-Nassau. Another relationship connected him to the Tromps, Maarten and his son Cornelis Tromp, both admirals of the Netherlands.

Johan and his older brother Cornelis grew up in a privileged environment in terms of education, his father having as good acquaintances important scholars and scientists, such as Isaac Beeckman, Jacob Cats, Gerardus Vossius, and Andreas Colvius. Johan and Cornelis both attended the Latin school in Dordrecht, which imbued them with the values of the Roman Republic. After attending the Latin school in Dordrecht, Johan de Witt studied at the Leiden University, where he excelled at mathematics and law. He received his doctorate from the University of Angers in 1645. He practiced law in The Hague as an associate with the firm of Frans van Schooten. In 1650 (the year that stadtholder William II, Prince of Orange died) he was appointed leader of the deputation of Dordrecht to the States of Holland and West Friesland. In December 1650, De Witt became the pensionary of Dordrecht. In 1652,  at the age of 27, De Witt was faced with a mob of angry demonstrators of sailors and fishermen in the city of Vlissingen.

Marriage and children

In 1655 Johan de Witt married Wendela Bicker, daughter of Johan Bicker and Agneta de Graeff van Polsbroek, who belonged to the inner circle of the powerful Amsterdam oligarchy. Through his marriage De Witt became a relative of the ruling patrician families Bicker, De Graeff, Hooft, Witsen, Boelens Loen, and Reynst among others. The famous Frans Banning Cocq became his uncle-in-law and Joachim Irgens von Westervick his cousin-in-law as well. Johan and Wendela had four children, three daughters and one son:
 Anna de Witt (1655–1725), married to Herman van den Honert 
 Agnes de Witt (1658–1688), married to Simon Teresteyn van Halewijn
 Maria de Witt (1660–1689), married to Willem Hooft
 Johan de Witt Jr. (1662–1701), secretary of the city of Dordrecht; married to Wilhelmina de Witt, the daughter of his uncle Cornelis de Witt

After De Witt's death, his brother-in-law Pieter de Graeff became the guardian of his children.

Politics

Grand Pensionary
In 1653, the States of Holland elected De Witt councilor pensionary. In making the appointment, De Witt relied on the express consent of Amsterdam, headed by his later uncle Cornelis de Graeff. Since Holland was the Republic's most powerful province, he was effectively the political leader of the United Provinces as a whole—especially during periods when no stadholder had been elected by the States of most Provinces. The raadpensionaris of Holland was often referred to as the Grand Pensionary by foreigners as he represented the preponderant province in the Union of the Dutch Republic. He was a servant who led the States of province by his experience, tenure, familiarity with the issues, and use of the staff at his disposal. He was in no manner equivalent to a modern Prime Minister.

Representing the province of Holland, De Witt tended to identify with the economic interests of the shipping and trading interests in the United Provinces. These interests were largely concentrated in the province of Holland, and to a lesser degree in the province of Zeeland.

Act of seclusion

De Witt's power base was the wealthy merchant and patrician class into which he was born. This class broadly coincided politically with the "States faction", stressing Protestant religious moderation and pragmatic foreign policy defending commercial interests. The "Orange faction", consisting of the middle class, preferred a strong leader from the Dutch House of Orange as a counterweight against the rich upper-classes in economic and religious matters. Although leaders that did emerge from the House of Orange rarely were strict Calvinists themselves, they tended to identify with Calvinism, which was popular among the middle classes in the United Provinces during this time. William II of Orange was a prime example of this tendency among the leaders of the House of Orange to support Calvinism. William II was elected Stadholder in 1647, and continued to serve until his death in November 1650. Eight days after his death, William II's wife delivered a male heir—William III of Orange. Many citizens of the United Provinces urged the election of the infant William III as stadholder under a regency until he came of age. However, the Provinces, under the dominance of the province of Holland Together with his uncle Cornelis de Graeff De Witt brought about peace with England after the First Anglo-Dutch War with the Treaty of Westminster in May 1654.

In 1657, De Witt and De Graeff mediated the "Treaty of Raalte", in which William III passed the stadholdership of Overijssel.

On 25 September 1660, the States of Holland under the prime movers of De Witt, De Graeff, his younger brother Andries de Graeff, along with Gillis Valckenier, resolved to take charge of William's education to ensure he would acquire the skills to serve in a future — although undetermined — state function. Influenced by the values of the Roman republic, de Witt did his utmost anyway to prevent any member of the House of Orange from gaining power, convincing many provinces to abolish the stadtholderate entirely. He bolstered his policy by publicly endorsing the theory of republicanism. He allegedly contributed personally to the Interest of Holland, a radical republican textbook published in 1662, by his supporter Pieter de la Court.

In the period following the Treaty of Westminster, the Republic grew in wealth and influence under De Witt's leadership. He created a strong navy, appointing one of his political allies, Lieutenant Admiral Jacob van Wassenaer Obdam, as supreme commander of the confederate fleet.

Disaster year and De Witt's Death

During 1672, which the Dutch refer to as the disaster year, France and England attacked the Republic in the Franco-Dutch War. De Witt was severely wounded by a knife-wielding assassin on 21 June. He resigned as Grand Pensionary on 4 August, but this was not enough for his enemies. His brother Cornelis (who was deputy-in-the-field for de Ruyter at the Raid on the Medway), particularly hated by the Orangists, was arrested on trumped-up charges of treason. He was tortured (as was usual under Roman-Dutch law, which required a confession before a conviction was possible) but refused to confess. Nevertheless, he was sentenced to exile. When his brother went over to the jail (which was only a few steps from his house) to help him get started on his journey, both were attacked by members of The Hague's civic militia. The brothers were shot and then left to the mob. Their naked, mutilated bodies were strung up on the nearby public gibbet, while the Orangist mob ate their roasted livers in a cannibalistic frenzy. Throughout it all, a remarkable discipline was maintained by the mob, according to contemporary observers, lending doubt as to the spontaneity of the event.

De Witt had in effect ruled the Republic for almost 20 years. His regime outlasted him only a few more days. Though no more people were killed, the lynching of the De Witts lent renewed impetus to the mob attacks, and to help restore public order the States of Holland empowered William on 27 August to purge the city councils in any way he would see fit to restore public order. The following purges in the early days of September were accompanied by large, but peaceful, Orangist demonstrations, that had a remarkable political character. The demonstrations delivered petitions that demanded certain additional reforms with a, in a sense, "reactionary" flavour: the "ancient" privileges of the guilds and civic militias—who were traditionally seen as mouthpieces of the citizenry as a whole—to curb the regent's powers were to be recognised again (as in pre-Burgundian times). The demonstrators also demanded more influence of the Calvinist preachers on the content of government policies and a roll-back of the toleration of Catholics and other dissenting denominations. The purges of the city governments were not everywhere equally thoroughgoing (and, of course, there was little mention of popular influence later on, as the new regents shared the abhorrence of the old ones of real democratic reforms). But as a whole, the new Orangist regime of the Stadtholder was well-entrenched during his following reign.

Whether William had a hand in the murder of the de Witt brothers remains unanswered, like his exact role in the later Massacre of Glencoe. That he ordered the withdrawal of a federal cavalry detachment that otherwise might have prevented the lynching has always raised eyebrows. He did not prosecute the well-known ringleaders like Johan van Banchem, Cornelis Tromp, and Johan Kievit, even advancing their careers. In any case, the political turmoil did not enable the allies an opportunity to finish the Republic off. The French were effectively stymied by the water defenses. Only when the inundations froze over in the following winter was there, briefly, a chance for Marshal Luxembourg, who had taken over command of the invading army from Louis, to make an incursion with 10,000 troops on skates. This almost ended in disaster, when they were ambushed. Meanwhile, the States General managed to conclude alliances with the German emperor and Brandenburg, which helped relieve the French pressure in the East.

Mathematics

The kinematic description of ellipses dates from Archimedes and Proclus, as well as the contemporary Claude Mydorge. Johan de Witt describes the hyperbola with a rotating line and a sliding angle, and a parabola by means of a rotating angle and sliding line. In 1661, de Witt's work appeared in the second volume of von Schooten's Latin translation of La Géométrie. Elementa Curvarum Linearum has been described as the first textbook in analytic geometry.

De Witt contributed to financial mathematics: The Worth of Life Annuities Compared to Redemption Bonds. This work combined his roles as statesman and as mathematician, and was discussed in the correspondence between Leibniz and Bernoulli concerning the use of probabilities. Ever since the Middle Ages, a life annuity was a way to obtain a regular income from a reliable source. The state, for instance, could provide a widow with a regular income until her death, in exchange for a 'lump sum' up front. There were also redemption bonds that were more like a regular state loan. De Witt showed that for the same principal a bond paying 4% interest would result in the same profit as a life annuity of 6% (1 in 17). But the 'Staten' at the time were paying over 7% (1 in 14). The publication about life annuities is "one of the first applications of probability in economics."

References

Footnotes

Bibliography

External links 

 
 
 
 

17th-century Dutch politicians
17th-century Dutch mathematicians
1625 births
1672 deaths
Assassinated Dutch politicians
Cannibalised people
Deaths by firearm in the Netherlands
Dutch members of the Dutch Reformed Church
Dutch States Party politicians
Grand Pensionaries
Leiden University alumni
Lynching deaths
Mathematical analysts
People from Dordrecht
People murdered in the Netherlands
University of Angers (pre-1793) alumni
De Witt family